A drama school, stage school or theatre school is an undergraduate and/or graduate school or department at a college or university; or a free-standing institution (such as the Drama section at the Juilliard School); which specializes in the pre-professional training in drama and theatre arts, such as acting, design and technical theatre, arts administration, and related subjects. If the drama school is part of a degree-granting institution, undergraduates typically take an Associate degree, Bachelor of Arts, Bachelor of Fine Arts, or, occasionally, Bachelor of Science or Bachelor of Design.  Graduate students may take a Master of Arts, Master of Science, Master of Fine Arts, Doctor of Arts, Doctor of Fine Arts, or Doctor of Philosophy degree.

Entry and application process

Entry to drama school is usually through a competitive audition process. Some schools make this a two-stage process. Places on an acting course are limited (usually well below 100) so those who fare best at the audition are selected. Most academies state that applicants must be over 18 years of age.
Auditions usually involve the performance of monologues and group workshops, and may also include a singing activity. This varies from academy to academy. If this is the case for an acting degree, the school looks more at how an applicant can put character into the song rather than how well they can sing. For a musical theatre degree, the emphasis is on showing one's talent as a singer. Most colleges offer callback auditions, often in several stages, in which students being considered for entry onto a course are brought back to audition again, demonstrating their talents further. It is also possible to get into a drama school by previous grades. Some auditioners may be under 18.

Course content

The courses offered by drama schools focus on practical courses, rather than theoretical classes. Their aim is to train students as professional actors for stage (theatre or musical theatre) and camera-based work (film and television shows). Students are required to be enthusiastic and motivated to meet the demands of the program. At the beginning of the final year (usually the third), most drama schools stage a series of performances throughout the academic year to which agents and casting directors are invited. This helps to build the future of the graduates and serves as a showcase of what the students can do.

Funding

United Kingdom
In 1833, actress Frances Maria Kelly managed the Royal Strand Theatre where she funded and operated a dramatic school, the earliest record of a drama school in England. In 1840 she financed the building of the Royalty Theatre in Soho which opened as Miss Kelly's Theatre and Dramatic School. In the UK The Conference of Drama Schools comprises Britain's 22 leading Drama Schools. CDS exists to strengthen the voice of the member schools, to set and maintain the highest standards of training within the vocational drama sector, and to make it easier for prospective students to understand the range of courses on offer and the application process. Founded in 1969, the 22 member schools offer courses in Acting, Musical Theatre, Directing and Technical Theatre training. Graduates of CDS courses are currently working on stage, in front of the camera and behind the scenes in theatres and studios across Britain. In September 2016, Midlands Academy of Musical Theatre opened in Birmingham. Offering West End quality training in Musical Theatre to students aged 18+, and with the same or better opportunities as many London drama schools, they offer a regional option for prospective drama school students. In 2012 it was merged with the National Council for Drama Training to create a single national authority Drama UK responsible for both the provision of Drama Training and accreditation of official courses. In 2017 Drama UK was replaced by the Federation of Drama Schools.

In the UK, funding varies from drama school to drama school. Historically drama schools were not part of the mainstream academic system, and therefore were not funded on the same basis as universities. Some drama schools are now part of a university, such as Guildhall School of Music and Drama, which is part of the City University of London, and Rose Bruford College of Theatre and Performance, which is part of the University of Manchester, and these tend to charge similar tuition fees to universities. Student loans, drama awards and scholarships may help to provide students with their funding.
The most prominent funding scheme for performing arts education in the UK are the Dance and Drama Awards.  This is a government scheme which subsidises the training offered at a selection of the leading performing arts schools in the fields of dance, drama, musical theatre and stage management.

Ireland
A number of third-level institutions provide courses in Drama and Theatre Studies, including Trinity College, Dublin, NUI Maynooth, and Dublin City University.  A decision by Trinity in January 2007 to drop its BA in Acting Studies to cut costs met with disappointment from the theatre sector. A Forum for Acting Training was convened with leading professionals from the industry who recommended in a report published 27 May 2008, that an Academy for Dramatic Arts, independent of a University, but with third level accreditation should be created. The report was submitted to the Irish Government.  On 1 August 2008, The Irish Times reported that a RADA graduate, Danielle Ryan, granddaughter of the late Tony Ryan who founded Ryanair, had announced plans to develop an Irish Academy of Dramatic Arts part-funded from a Trust created by her late father, Captain Cathal Ryan.

This plan went ahead and the academy, known as The Lir Academy, opened in September 2011. The Lir is part of Trinity College and is situated in the Grand Canal Dock area. It is officially associated with RADA.

Drama schools

Australia 

 Aboriginal Centre for the Performing Arts (ACPA), (Fortitude Valley, Brisbane)
 Australian Institute of Music - Dramatic Arts (Sydney)
 Faculty of Fine Arts and Music, University of Melbourne
 Helpmann Academy (Adelaide)
 National Institute of Dramatic Art, also known as NIDA (Sydney)
 National Theatre Drama School, (Melbourne)
 Screenwise (Surry Hills, New South Wales)
 Western Australian Academy of Performing Arts (WAAPA), Edith Cowan University (Perth)

Austria 
 University of Music and Performing Arts Graz, Graz
 Institute for Theatre and Drama (ACT), Anton Bruckner Private University, Linz
 University of Mozarteum, Salzburg
 Max Reinhardt Seminar, University of Music and Performing Arts, Vienna
 Music and Arts University of the City of Vienna, Vienna
 Theatre, Film and Media Studies - University of Vienna

Belgium 
 AcSenT (Accademie voor Spel en Theater (Antwerp)
 , École supérieure des Arts (Mons)
 Erasmushogeschool Brussel (English name: Erasmus University College Brussels)
 Institut national supérieur des arts du spectacle et des techniques de diffusion (INSAS), Brussels
 Faculty of Arts and Philosophy, Ghent University
 LUCA School of Arts, KU Leuven (Brussels)
 Royal Academy of Fine Arts Antwerp (Antwerp)
 Royal Conservatory of Ghent, University College Ghent (Ghent/Aalst)
 Royal Conservatory of Liège (Liège)
 Institut des arts de diffusion (Louvain-la-Neuve)

Canada 

Alberta

 School of Creative and Performing arts, University of Calgary (Calgary)
 Drama Department, University of Lethbridge Calgary Campus (Calgary)
 Department of Fine Arts and Humanities, University of Alberta Augustana Campus (Camrose)
 Department of Fine Arts, Concordia University of Edmonton (Edmonton)
 Department of Theatre, MacEwan University (Edmonton)
 Department of Drama, University of Alberta (Edmonton)
 Drama Department, University of Lethbridge (Lethbridge)

British Columbia

 University of the Fraser Valley (Abbotsford)
 Faculty of Arts, Thompson Rivers University (Kamloops)
 Kelowna Actors Studio (Kelowna)
 School of the Arts, Media + Culture - Trinity Western University (Langley)
 School of Performing Arts, Capilano University (North Vancouver)
 New Image College (Vancouver)
 School for the Contemporary Arts, Simon Fraser University (Vancouver)
 Studio 58 (Vancouver)
 Department of Theatre and Film, University of British Columbia (Vancouver)
 VanArts (Vancouver)
 Faculty of Fine Arts, University of Victoria (Victoria)

Manitoba

 Faculty of Arts, Brandon University (Brandon)
 Department of English, Theatre, Film & Media at the University of Manitoba (Winnipeg)
 Department of Theatre and Film, University of Winnipeg (Winnipeg)

New Brunswick 

 Department of Dramatic Art, Université de Moncton (Moncton)
 Department of Drama Studies, Mount Allison University (Sackville)
 InterAction School of Performing Arts, Saint John

Newfoundland and Labrador

 School of Fine Arts, Memorial University of Newfoundland (Corner Brook)

Nova Scotia

 Fountain School of Performing Arts, Dalhousie University (Halifax)
 Faculty of Arts and Social Science, University of King's College (Halifax)
 Department of English & Theatre, Acadia University (Wolfville)

Ontario

 School of English & Theatre Studies, University of Guelph (Guelph)
 School of the Arts (SOTA), McMaster University (Hamilton)
 Queen's University Dan School of Drama & Music (Kingston)
 Department of Theatre, University of Ottawa
 Marilyn I. Walker School of Fine and Performing Arts, Brock University (St. Catharines)
 Faculty of Arts, Laurentian University (Sudbury)
 Centennial College Theatre Arts and Performance (Toronto)
 Centre for Drama, Theatre & Performance Studies - University of Toronto
 Centre for Indigenous Theatre (Toronto)
 Theatre Arts - Performance, Humber College (Toronto)
 George Brown Theatre School (Toronto)
 Randolph Academy for the Performing Arts (Toronto)
 Shakespeare's Globe Centres (Toronto)
 School of the Arts, Media, Performance & Design - York University (Toronto)
 School of Dramatic Art, University of Windsor (Windsor)

Quebec

 Conservatoire d'art dramatique de Montréal
 Montréal Children's Theatre
 National Theatre School of Canada (Montréal)
 Faculty of Arts, Université du Québec à Montréal
 Université Laval (Quebec City)
 Department of Drama, Bishop's University (Sherbrooke)

Saskatchewan

 Faculty of Media, Art, and Performance - University of Regina (Regina)
 Department of Drama, University of Saskatchewan (Saskatoon)

Denmark 

 Den Danske Scenekunstskole (Aarhus, Copenhagen, Odense)
 Copenaghen International School of Performing Arts

Russia 

 Russian Institute of Theatre Arts, Moscow
 Boris Shchukin Theatre Institute, Moscow
 Mikhail Shchepkin Higher Theatre School, Moscow
 Moscow Art Theatre School, Moscow
 Russian State Institute of Performing Arts, Saint Petersburg
 Novosibirsk State Theater Institute, Novosibirsk
 Yaroslavl State Theater Institute, Yaroslavl
 Yekaterinburg State Theater Institute, Yekaterinburg

See also 

Acting coach
Acting workshop

References

External links
 

 
Performing arts education
Types of vocational school